Myōjin (明神 'shining deity', 'illuminating deity', or 'apparent deity') or Daimyōjin (大明神 'great shining/apparent deity') was a title historically applied to Japanese (Shinto) deities (kami) and, by metonymy, their shrines.

The term is thought to have been derived from myōjin (名神 'notable deity'), a title once granted by the imperial court to kami deemed to have particularly impressive power and virtue and/or have eminent, well-established shrines and cults. This term is first attested in the Shoku Nihongi, where offerings from the kingdom of Bohai (Balhae) are stated to have been offered to "the eminent shrines (名神社 myōjin-sha) in each province" in the year 730 (Tenpyō 2).

An epithet homophonous with this imperially bestowed title, "shining/apparent kami" (written with different Chinese characters), was in popular usage from around the Heian period up until the end of the Edo period, coexisting with titles with more explicit Buddhist overtones such as gongen (権現 'incarnation') or daibosatsu (大菩薩 'great bodhisattva').

The earliest recorded usages of 'shining/apparent deity' are found in sources such as in the Sumiyoshi-taisha Jindaiki (住吉大社神代記, "The Sumiyoshi Grand Shrine's Records of the Age of the Gods", supposedly compiled in the year 731 but thought to actually be of a much later date), which refers to the three Sumiyoshi deities as 'Sumiyoshi Daimyōjin' (住吉大明神), and the Nihon Sandai Jitsuroku (completed in 901), which refers to 'Matsuo Daimyōjin' (松尾大明神).

While at first this title did not yet seem to have the Buddhist connotations that would later be associated with it, the connection between daimyōjin with the concept of honji suijaku (i.e. that the native kami are actually manifestations of Buddhist deities) was reinforced by an apocryphal utterance of the Buddha often claimed to be derived from the Karuṇāpuṇḍarīka-sūtra (悲華經 "Compassionate Lotus Sutra"; Japanese: Hikekyō) quoted and alluded to in various medieval works, but which is not in the actual sutra's text: "After I have passed into nirvana, during the Latter Day of the Law, I shall appear as a great shining/apparent deity (大明神) and save all sentient beings."

Up until the early modern period, use of titles such as myōjin or gongen for many deities and their shrines were so widespread that these gods were rarely referred to by their proper names. For instance, both the god of Kashima Shrine and the shrine itself were known as 'Kashima Daimyōjin' (鹿島大明神); the deity enshrined in Suwa Grand Shrine was called 'Suwa Daimyōjin' (諏訪(大)明神), and so on. (cf. Hachiman-daibosatsu (八幡大菩薩) or Kumano Gongen (熊野権現)). After his death, Toyotomi Hideyoshi was deified under the name 'Toyokuni Daimyōjin' (豊国大明神).

Under Yoshida Shintō, the conferral of ranks and titles like myōjin was institutionalized, with the sect issuing out authorization certificates to shrines for a fee. The sect considered the title to be higher than the overtly Buddhist gongen as part of the sect's inversion of honji suijaku, an issue which became a point of contention with the Sannō Ichijitsu Shintō (山王一実神道) sect spearheaded by the Tendai monk Tenkai.

When the Meiji government officially separated Shinto from Buddhism, official use of titles and terminology perceived as having Buddhist connotations such as (dai)myōjin, (dai)gongen or daibosatsu by shrines were legally abolished and discouraged. However, a few deities/shrines are still often referred to as (dai)myōjin in popular usage even today. (E.g. Kanda Myōjin in Chiyoda, Tokyo, enshrining the deified vengeful spirit of Taira no Masakado).

See also
Shinbutsu-shūgō, the syncretism of Buddhism and native kami worship
Honji suijaku
Shinbutsu bunri, the official separation of Shinto from Buddhism during the Meiji period

Notes

References

Buddhism in Japan
Shinbutsu shūgō
Shinto in Japan